The FIH Player of the Year Awards are awarded annually by the International Hockey Federation to the male and female field hockey players adjudged to be the best in the world. The awards were established in 1998 and have been awarded annually ever since. In 2001 the FIH Young Player of the Year award was created, to be awarded to the best young field hockey player of the year.

Winners

Awards by country

References

Sports trophies and awards
Awards established in 1998
International Hockey Federation